Warfield Complex, Hubner, and T Buildings is a national historic district located at Sykesville, Carroll County, Maryland, United States.  It comprises the historic core of the women's facility at Springfield State Hospital, a public mental institution.  It was developed over the period 1898–1939.  The complex comprises 16 contributing resources unified by a consistently high level of architectural elaboration in the Georgian and Colonial Revival style.

It was added to the National Register of Historic Places in 2000.

References

External links
, including photo from 2006, at Maryland Historical Trust

Hospital buildings on the National Register of Historic Places in Maryland
Colonial Revival architecture in Maryland
Georgian Revival architecture in Maryland
Historic districts in Carroll County, Maryland
Historic districts on the National Register of Historic Places in Maryland
Sykesville, Maryland
National Register of Historic Places in Carroll County, Maryland